A normal plane is any plane containing the normal vector of a surface at a particular point.

The normal plane also refers to the plane that is perpendicular to the tangent vector of a space curve; (this plane also contains the normal vector)  see Frenet–Serret formulas.

Normal section 
The normal section of a surface at a particular point is the curve produced by the intersection of that surface with a normal plane.

The curvature of the normal section is called the normal curvature.

If the surface is bow or cylinder shaped, the maximum and the minimum of these curvatures are the principal curvatures.

If the surface is saddle shaped the maxima of both sides are the principal curvatures.

The product of the principal curvatures is the Gaussian curvature of the surface (negative for saddle shaped surfaces).

The mean of the principal curvatures is the mean curvature of the surface; if (and only if) the mean curvature is zero, the surface is called a minimal surface.

See also 
 Earth normal section
 Normal bundle
 Normal curvature
 Osculating plane
 Principal curvature
 Tangent plane (geometry)

References 

Geometrical optics
Surfaces
Differential geometry